Thrombosis Lymphoma (ThroLy) predictive score is a multivariable model for thromboembolic events in patients with lymphoma.

Characteristics 
ThroLy score was developed and published in 2017 by a group of doctors from Serbia and United States. As a simple model, it was initially internally validated based on individual clinical and laboratory patient characteristics that would classify lymphoma patients at risk for a thromboembolic event. Based on the investigation conducted on derivation and validation cohorts, the variables independently associated with the risk for thromboembolism were: previous venous and/or arterial events, mediastinal involvement, BMI>30 kg/m2, reduced mobility, extranodal localization, development of neutropenia and hemoglobin level < 100g/L.

Risk classification 
Based on the risk score, patients with lymphoma can be classified in three different risk groups.

Further validations 
ThroLy score considers some particular characteristics of lymphoma patients, such as extranodal localization and mediastinal involvement. In addition to having a strong positive predictive value, the score is not limited to either hospitalized or outpatient settings, and does not require non-routine laboratory analyses. In order to be fully applicable in clinical practice, several validation studies have been performed, and several more are ongoing.

References

Lymphoma